SoundTrack_Cologne is a conference for music and sound in film, video games and media which has been held annually in Cologne, Germany, since 2004.

Overview 
SoundTrack_Cologne is Europe's largest congress for music and sound in film, games and media. In some 50 round tables, panels, workshops and networking events, the focus is on current developments in the culture, law, marketing and technics of media music as well as business cases, professionalization and networking.

SEE THE SOUND 
SEE THE SOUND, the film programme of SoundTrack_Cologne shows the broad array of connecting image and sound and brings films about music to the big screen.

European Education Alliance for Music and Sound in Media 
EEAMS supports educators, students and industry professionals in the areas of filmmaking, sound design and media music composition and seeks to forge an inclusive framework to support collaborative links and to bridge interdisciplinary boundaries.

Awards 
 SoundTrack_Cologne Lifetime Achievement Award
 Peer Raben Music Award
 WDR Filmscore Award
 European Talent Award: Best Sound Design
 See The Sound Music Documentary Award
 Award for the Best German Live Music TV-Show

Award Winners 2004 
 Juhan Vihterpal (Estonia) - New Sound in European Film
 Tom Werner, Michael Schlappa & Ralf Herrmann (Germany) – European Talent Award: Best Sound Design

Award Winners 2005 
 Maria Ushenina (Russia) – New Sound in European Film
 Christopher Wilson (Great Britain) – European Talent Award: Best Sound Design
 Dimitri Dodoras (Deutschland) - Skoda SoundTrack Award for students

Award Winners 2006 
 Paul van Vulpen (The Netherlands) – New Sound in European Film
 Matthias Heuser, Lief Thomas & Christiane Buchmann – European Talent Award: Best Sound Design

Award Winners 2007 
 Alexander Reumers (The Netherlands) – New Sound in European Film
 Ravian de Vries & Susanne Grünewald (The Netherlands) – European Talent Award: Best Sound Design

Award Winners 2008 
 Peter Thomas – SoundTrack_Cologne Lifetime Achievement Award
 Joram Letwory (The Netherlands) – New Sound in European Film
 Henning Knoepfel (Great Britain) – European Talent Award: Best Sound Design
 Antoni Łazarkiewicz "Die zweite Frau" – German TV Music Award

Award Winners 2009 
 Irmin Schmidt – SoundTrack_Cologne Lifetime Achievement Award
 Felix Rösch (Germany) – New Sound in European Film
 Phillip Specht (Germany) – European Talent Award: Best Sound Design
 Titas Petrikis (Lithuania) – Peer Raben Music Award
 Biber Gullatz & Andreas Schäfer (Komponist) "Der verlorene Vater" – German TV Music Award

Award Winners 2010 
 Bruhn Christian Bruhn – SoundTrack_Cologne Lifetime Achievement Award
 Martin Batchelar (Great Britain) – WDR Filmscore Award
 Jens Heuler & Dominik Campus (Germany) – European Talent Award: Best cooperation between composer and sound designer
 Jewgeni Birkhoff (Germany) – Peer Raben Music Award
 German TV Music Award
- Fabian Römer (Composer): "Tatort: Weil sie böse sind" - Best Music a TV Movie
- Sven Rossenbach & Florian van Volxem: "Im Angesicht des Verbrechens" Best Music for a TV Series
- Michael Kadelbach: Henners Traum – Das größte Tourismusprojekt Europas Best Music for a Documentary

Award Winners 2011 
 Horst Peter Koll – SoundTrack_Cologne Lifetime Achievement Award
 Olivier Militon (France) – WDR Filmscore Award
 Nathan Blais (France) – European Talent Award: Best Sound Design
 Pablo Pico (France) – Peer Raben Music Award

Award Winners 2012 
 Michael Nyman – SoundTrack_Cologne Lifetime Achievement Award
 John Chua (Singapore) – WDR Filmscore Award
 Sebastian Kübler (Germany) – European Talent Award: Best Sound Design
 Enrica Sciandrone (Italy/Great Britain) – Peer Raben Music Award

Award Winners 2013 
 Manfred Eicher – SoundTrack_Cologne Lifetime Achievement Award
 Filip Šijanec (Slovenia) – WDR Filmscore Award
 Artur Khayrullin (Russia) – European Talent Award: Best Sound Design
 Rosanna Zünd (Switzerland) – Peer Raben Music Award
 Kidd Life (Denmark) – See The Sound Music Documentary Award
 Laurence Owen (Great Britain) – Früh Kölsch Audience Award for the Best Music in a Short Film

Award Winners 2014 
 Eberhard Schoener – SoundTrack_Cologne Lifetime Achievement Award
 Marianna Liik (Estonia) – WDR Filmscore Award
 Friso Hoekstra (The Netherlands) – European Talent Award: Best Sound Design
 Denise Barth (Germany) – Peer Raben Music Award
 Europe in 8 Bits (Spain) – See The Sound Music Documentary Award

Award Winners 2015 
 Enjott Schneider – SoundTrack_Cologne Lifetime Achievement Award
 Damian Scholl (Germany) – WDR Filmscore Award
 Armin Badde (Germany) – European Talent Award: Best Sound Design
 Stanislav Makovsky (Russia) – Peer Raben Music Award
 The Case of the Three Sided Dream (USA) – See The Sound Music Documentary Award

Award Winners 2016 
 Cliff Martinez – SoundTrack_Cologne Lifetime Achievement Award
 Daniel Herget (Germany) – WDR Filmscore Award
 Jérémy Bocquet (France) – European Talent Award: Best Sound Design
 Filip Sijanec (Slovenia) – Peer Raben Music Award
 I Go Back Home - Jimmy Scott – See The Sound Music Documentary Award
 zdf@bauhaus - Award for the Best German Live Music TV-Show

Award Winners 2017 
 Bruce Broughton – SoundTrack_Cologne Lifetime Achievement Award
 Thomas Chabalier (France) – WDR Filmscore Award
 Martin B. Janssen (France) – Peer Raben Music Award
 Liberation Day – See The Sound Music Documentary Award
 Berlin live - Award for the Best German Live Music TV-Show

Award Winners 2018 

 Craig Armstrong – SoundTrack_Cologne Lifetime Achievement Award
 Ben Winkler (Germany) – WDR Filmscore Award
 Celia Ruiz Artacho (Spain) – European Talent Award: Best Sound Design
 Mateja Starič (Slovenia) – Peer Raben Music Award
 Silvana – See The Sound Music Documentary Award

Award Winners 2019 

 Klaus Doldinger – SoundTrack_Cologne Lifetime Achievement Award
 Leon Maximilian Brückner (Germany) – WDR Filmscore Award
 Paul Clímaco Müller Reyes (Germany) – European Talent Award: Best Sound Design
 Mateo Ojeda (Colombia) – Peer Raben Music Award
 BNK48: Girls Don’t Cry – See The Sound Music Documentary Award

Award Winners 2020 

 Don Davis – SoundTrack_Cologne Lifetime Achievement Award
 Fabian Zeidler (Germany) – WDR Filmscore Award
 Sinan Varis (Germany) – European Talent Award: Best Sound Design
 Alex Symcox (USA) – Peer Raben Music Award
 Everybody's Everything – See The Sound Music Documentary Award

Award Winners 2021 

 Rachel Portman – SoundTrack_Cologne Lifetime Achievement Award
 Ludwig Peter Müller (Germany) – WDR Filmscore Award
 Maximilian Sattler (Germany) – European Talent Award: Best Sound Design
 Paulo Gallo – Peer Raben Music Award
 Shut up Sona – See The Sound Music Documentary Award

Award Winners 2022 

 Walter Murch – SoundTrack_Cologne Lifetime Achievement Award
 Lorenzo Gioelli (Italy) – WDR Filmscore Award
 David Kamp (Germany) – Peer Raben Music Award
 Anonymous Club – See The Sound Music Documentary Award

Speakers at SoundTrack Cologne (selection) 
 Petri Alanko (games composer Quantum Break, Alan Wake)
 Ali N. Askin (Lola-Award Winner; composer Leroy, Lost Children (2005 film))
 Lesley Barber (composer Manchester by the Sea (film))
 Marcel Barsotti (composer)
 Gerd Baumann (Lola-Award winner; composer)
 Marco Beltrami (Oscar-nominated; composer I, Robot, Hellboy, Terminator 3: Rise of the Machines, Scream)
 Jean-Michel Bernard (composer The Science of Sleep)
 Volker Bertelmann (Oscar-nominated Lion (2016 film))
 Steve Blame (Screenwriter)
 Bruce Broughton (composer Dallas (1978 TV series), Silverado (film), Tombstone (film))
 Christian Bruhn (composer Captain Future)
 Björn Dixgård (singer and composer of Mando Diao)
 Klaus Doldinger (composer Das Boot, The NeverEnding Story (film), Tatort)
 Patrick Doyle (composer Harry Potter and the Goblet of Fire (film), Thor)
 Greg Edmonson (composer for film and TV King of the Hill (1997–2009), and the video game series Uncharted 1–3)
 John Frizzell (composer Alien Resurrection, Ghost Ship, The Reaping)
 Yoav Goren (Emmy Award Winner, music producer, film composer (i. a. Cloud Atlas (film), Spider-Man 2, The Da Vinci Code (film), Iron Man 3, The Lord of the Rings (film series)))
 Jason Graves (BAFTA-Award Winner and composer, i. a. for the video game series Dead Space (2008 video game), Heroes of Might and Magic, Silent Hunter or Tomb Raider)
 Chris Hülsbeck (games composer, Turrican, The Great Giana Sisters)
 Jan A. P. Kaczmarek (Oscar-Winner & composer, Finding Neverland (film), Hachi: A Dog's Tale)
 Johnny Klimek (composer Run Lola Run, Cloud Atlas (film), Perfume: The Story of a Murderer (film))
 Harald Kloser (composer The Day After Tomorrow) 
 Antoni Łazarkiewicz (composer Winter Journey (2006 film))
 Nils Petter Molvær (trumpet player & composer Stratosphere Girl)
 John Ottman (composer & editor The Usual Suspects, X-Men (film series))
 Owen Pallett (Oscar-nominated, violinist, singer Her (film))
 Rachel Portman (composer, Oscar-Winner Emma (1996 theatrical film))
 Niki Reiser (Lola-Winner and composer Nowhere in Africa)
 Michael Riessler (composer Home from Home (2013 film))
 Jeff Rona (composer Traffic (2000 film), God of War (franchise))
 Marius Ruhland (composer Heaven)
 Stefan Ruzowitzky (Oscar-Winner; director The Counterfeiters)
 Dieter Schleip (composer)
 Volker Schlöndorff (director The Tin Drum)
 Irmin Schmidt (composer Can, Palermo Shooting)
 Garry Schyman (games composer BioShock)
 Peter Thomas (composer Raumpatrouille)
 Annette Focks (composer Krabat)
 Andreas Weidinger (composer)
 Matthias Weber (Lola-Winner, composer, Baywatch)
 Ralf Wengenmayr (composer Lissi und der wilde Kaiser, Der Schuh des Manitu)
 Bernd Wefelmeyer (conductor (1993 to 1995 Deutsches Filmorchester Babelsberg) and composer)
 Bert Wrede (composer)
 Gabriel Yared (Oscar-Winner; composer The Lives of Others)
 Helmut Zerlett (composer, Lessons of a Dream)
 Inon Zur (games composer, Crysis, Fallout: New Vegas)

References

External links 

Music festivals in Germany
Film festivals in Germany
Festivals in Cologne